Paul Upton (born 12 July 1988) is an Irish professional boxer trained by Ricky Hatton.

Amateur career
Upton was an Irish under-21 champion.

Irish title
On 23 April 2016 Upton won the Boxing Union of Ireland super welterweight title defeating Terry Maughan.  This was his only fight of 2016.

Personal life
He is one of three boxing brothers, along with Sonny (also trained by Ricky Hatton) and Anthony.

References

External links
 

1988 births
Living people
Irish male boxers
Light-middleweight boxers